Daniel Åkervall (born 23 May 1982) is a Swedish footballer who plays for IK Brage as a midfielder.

References

External links
 
 

1982 births
Living people
Swedish footballers
Association football midfielders
IF Sylvia players
Ljungskile SK players
IK Brage players
Superettan players
Allsvenskan players